Qezel Darreh or Qezeldarreh may refer to:

Qezel Darreh, Ardabil
Qezel Darreh, East Azerbaijan
Qezel Darreh, Kermanshah
Qezel Darreh, Qazvin
Qezel Darreh, Zanjan